José of Braganza, Archbishop of Braga (Lisbon, 6 May 1703, Ponte de Lima - 3 June 1756) was a natural son of Portuguese King Peter II and a Portuguese lady named Francisca Clara da Silva.

He studied at the University of Évora and achieved a doctorate in Theology. He became Archbishop of Braga in 1739 and was consecrated in 1741.

He built in Braga the Sete Fontes a water supply system.

He is buried in the same city.

He was succeeded in his position by another natural-born noble, Gaspar of Braganza, Archbishop of Braga, son of his half-brother John V of Portugal.

1703 births
1756 deaths
Illegitimate children of Portuguese monarchs
Clergy from Lisbon
18th-century Roman Catholic archbishops in Portugal
Roman Catholic archbishops of Braga
University of Évora alumni
Sons of kings